Caymanabyssia rhina is a species of small sea snail, a marine gastropod mollusk in the family Caymanabyssiidae, the false limpets. The species has been verified to possess more defined threads and spine spacing on the teleoconch than other species of the genus.

References

External links
 To World Register of Marine Species

Caymanabyssiidae
Gastropods described in 1986